Buchi can mean:


Items
Bachi, special Japanese drumsticks
Butsi, the Hispanised term for jin deui (pastry made from glutinous rice) in the Philippines
Büchi automaton, finite state automata extended to infinite inputs
Büchi arithmetic, a mathematical logical fragment

People

Given names
Buchi Atuonwu, Nigerian reggae gospel artist
Buchi (comedian), stage name of Onyebuchi Ojieh, Nigerian comedian
Buchi Emecheta, (d. 2017) Nigerian British writer

Family names
George Büchi (1921–1998), an organic chemist
Julius Richard Büchi (1924–1984), developer of the Büchi automaton
Hernán Büchi (born 1949), Finance Minister of Chile (1985–1989)
Albert Büchi (1907–1988), a Swiss professional road bicycle racer

Nicknames
Yutaka Izubuchi, anime designer and director
Nigerian Igbo first names such as Onyebuchi, Nnabuchi, Maduabuchi, a suffix that translates as "...is God."

Fictional characters
Buchi in One Piece